State Route 27 (SR 27) is an east–west state highway in southeastern Tennessee. The  route traverses portions of Marion and Hamilton counties in Tennessee, including the Chattanooga area. Both of this route's termini are at state lines. Its western end is at the Alabama state line near South Pittsburg, and its eastern end is at the Georgia state line on Chattanooga's south side.

Route description

Marion County
SR 27 begins as it runs concurrently as a secret, or hidden, designation, with U.S. Route 72 (US 72) once that highway enters Tennessee from Jackson County, Alabama. This point also marks the eastern terminus of unsigned Alabama State Route 2. During SR 27's concurrency with US 72 in Marion County, it traverses the cities of South Pittsburg, Kimball, and the Marion County seat of Jasper, as well as the exit 152 interchange on Interstate 24, where they pick up US 64. They then pick up SR 2 so it, too becomes a secret designation. They join US 41 in Jasper. SR 27 departs from US 41/US 64/US 72 and SR 2 near Nickajack Lake, and then SR 27 travels northward to Powells Crossroads. After the brief concurrency with SR 283 in that area, SR 27 changes from a secondary route to a primary one, and then enters Hamilton County.

Hamilton County
Near Signal Mountain, SR 27 once again becomes a hidden route when it joins US 127 as well as another secret designation in SR 8 just within Chattanooga's northern outskirts. SR 27 then joins US 27 (SR 29), still as a secret designation for the rest of its course southeastward, including the segment of the US 27 freeway that also has an unsigned designation of Interstate 124 (I-124). US 27 and SR 27 passes through downtown Chattanooga, with a brief concurrency with I-24 between exits 178 and 180, and then it turns southward, still following US 27, and for SR 27 to terminate at the Georgia state line, which in this area, it coincides with the Chattanooga city limits, as well as those of Rossville, Georgia and Walker County's northern boundary. US 27 continues southward with Georgia State Route 1 into the northwest Georgia counties of Walker and Catoosa.

Major intersections

See also

References
Mileage retrieved from DeLorme Street Atlas USA
Official Tennessee Highway Maps

External links
Tennessee Department of Transportation

027
027
027
027
U.S. Route 27
U.S. Route 41
U.S. Route 64